The Pirelli Cinturato is a Pirelli-developed car tyre that was the first example of a wrap-around radial tyre structure.  It was used to good effect in motorsport, and most modern tyres are based upon the design. The five-times Formula One World Champion Juan Manuel Fangio called the Pirelli Cinturato "Extraordinary" and raced on it many times in the remainder of his career.

History 

First developed in 1952 under the name Pirelli Cintura, taking the name Cinturato in 1963, the tyre was composed of two or three carcass plies of cords laid at an angle of 90 degrees to the beads, and a belt of several plies laid circumferentially under the tread. Without a belt, the 90-degree plies would produce a casing which would greatly increase its sectional height on inflation. The belt, being inextensible, prevented the casing increasing in height when inflated, and the inflated tyre maintained almost the same dimensions as in the mould in which it went through vulcanisation. The belt was kept under tension, and the tread retained its flatter profile even when the tyre was inflated.

The Pirelli Cinturato may be compared to a wheel in which the rim is attached to the hub by means of fine spokes. The tread and belt are in effect the rim; the 90-degree or radial cord plies are the spokes; and the bead is the hub. The inextensible belt and the radial casing cords were the combined factors which gave the Cinturato tyre its special properties.
The different geometric arrangement of the Cinturato carcass resulted in greater deformation (bulging) in the area of the tyre section which is under load, as opposed to previous radial tyres of the period. This caused no disadvantage and did not result in greater tyre casing fatigue. Rather than having the dynamic wave form behind the road contact area, it instead formed on the side wall, increasing stability whilst also allowing the heat generated by cornering and braking to be easily dispersed.

During the 1950s, 1960s and 1970s the Pirelli Cinturato was the original equipment tyre for many exotic Italian cars including Lamborghini, Lancia, Alfa Romeo, Maserati, Ferrari as well as for cars produced by other manufacturers worldwide, including MG, Rover Group, Volvo and Lotus Cars. Many other international car manufacturers such as Jaguar and Aston Martin that were still fitting crossply tyres as standard equipment fitted Pirelli Cinturato as their radial upgrade for customers that could afford it. By the end of 1968 Pirelli was exporting or directly manufacturing the Cinturato to or in as many as 137 countries worldwide.
In 2014, the Pirelli Cinturato P7 was developed, derived from F1 technology, which had permitted Valtteri Bottas to drive his F1 car at a maximum speed of 316 km/h in fog.

The first Cinturato tread pattern was the CA67, still made today in the sizes 165HR14, 155HR15, 165HR15, 185VR15 & 185VR16. Immediately recognisable as it was fitted to so many desirable cars such as the 250 GT Ferrari and Maserati 3500GT. It was also the tread pattern that Jaguar fitted to its XK150, series 1 E type and MK2 Saloons (Jaguar never fitted Pirelli tyres as original equipment on any model XK, E type nor Mark 2 saloons, but were only offered as aftermarket replacements) and that Aston Martin fitted to their DB2, DB3, DB4, DB5 & DB6 if a customer specified they required radial tyres. The Cinturato CA67 is also famously the tyre that Roger Moore had fitted to his Volvo P1800 in the series The Saint.

In 1964 Pirelli developed a new extra large high performance tyre with a 205 section and a new tread pattern that was designated CN72 HS (HS standing for High Speed). This new tyre again took the world of sportscars by storm and kept the Cinturato as the tyre of choice for sports cars such as Ferrari 330 GT 2+2, Iso Grifo, Lamborghini Miura and Maserati Ghibli. Once again Aston Martin also offered them as a radial alternative for their DBS.

Towards the end of 1968 the new tyre technology was low profile tyres. Pirelli were hot on the tail with their new CN36 which came out in 1969. The CN36 had a striking tread pattern and was a favourite for the likes of the Porsche 911, Ford Escort & Ford Cortina. 1971 would see Pirelli’s introduction of another high speed (HS) tyre with their CN12 Cinturato HS. These tyres were rated to be able to withstand the exceptional power of the Lamborghini Miura SV, and today their 205/70VR15 Pirelli Cinturato tyre holds a W speed rating (170 mph).

Usage in motorsports

It is used in Formula 1 racing series when it is raining.

References

Bibliography 

.
.

External links 
 Juan Manuel Fangio driving on Pirelli Cinturato
 current Cinturato range

Tires
Pirelli
Auto parts